Agnisakshi…Ek Samjhauta is an Indian Hindi-language television drama series. Produced by Pichchar Studio and an official remake of Colors Kannada's series Agnisakshi, it stars Shivika Pathak and Aashay Mishra. It premiered on 23 January 2023 on Colors TV.

Plot 
Jivika Rane dreams of a happy married life and children. Saatvik is a rich businessman who always ovey his father, Narayan Bhonsle.
Saatvik promised his father to get married while convincing the latter for urgent angioplasty. There, Jivika fell from height due to Saatvik's negligence and could never conceive in future. Jivika's sister-in-law blackmailed Saatvik ' family in order to get them married.

Cast

Main 
 Shivika Pathak as Jeevika Rane
 Aashay Mishra as Satvik Bhosle

Recurring 

 Pradeep Shembekar as Manohar Rane: Jeevika's Father
 Shilpa Gandhi as Jeevika's Mother
 Bharat Pahuja as Narayan Bhosle: Patriarch of Bhosle Family

Production

Development
The series was announced by Pichchar Studio for Colors TV in November 2022. It is the remake of Colors Kannada's Kannada series Agnisakshi, that aired from 2 December 2013 to 3 January 2020. Initially it was aired from Monday to Friday but from 16 February 2023, it started airing from Thursday to Sunday and later on from 18 March started airing from Monday to Friday again .

Casting
Shivika Pathak as Jeevika Rane and Aashay Mishra as Satvik Bhosle were signed as the lead.

See also  
 List of programmes broadcast by Colors TV

References

External links 
 Agnisakshi on Colors TV
 Agnisakshi…Ek Samjhauta on Voot

2023 Indian television series debuts
Indian drama television series
Hindi-language television shows
Colors TV original programming